Peter Marc Stahl is an American musician best known for fronting the Virginia-based punk/hardcore band Scream with his brother Franz. Early on, Scream also featured Nirvana drummer and Foo Fighters frontman Dave Grohl on drums who credited Pete Stahl as the inspiration for the song "My Hero" for his tutelage.

Stahl later went on to form Wool with his brother in the 1990s, and also has sung for Goatsnake and Earthlings?. He also worked for The Viper Room in Los Angeles, and contributed to the Sunn O))) album ØØ Void, and was featured on Orquesta del Desierto, a series of albums written about the desert. Stahl has also contributed to volumes 1 to 4 of Josh Homme's musical collaborative series The Desert Sessions, and toured with Queens of the Stone Age from 1998 to 1999 to perform these songs in addition to doing backing vocals for various songs by Queens of the Stone Age.

Stahl also works as a tour manager, primarily for Rival Sons and Coheed and Cambria.

Discography 

Scream
1983: Still Screaming (Dischord Records)
1985: This Side Up (Dischord Records)
1986: Banging the Drum (Dischord Records)
1988: No More Censorship (RAS Records)
1989: State of the Union (Compilation) (Dischord Records)
1990: Your Choice Live Series Vol.10 (Live album) (Your Choice Records)
1991: It's Your Choice (Compilation) (Your Choice Records)
1993: Fumble (Dischord Records)
1998: Live at the Black Cat (Live album) (Torque Records)
2003: 20 Years of Dischord (Compilation) (Dischord Records)
2011: Complete Control Recording Sessions (Live Studio EP) (SideOneDummy Records)

Wool
1992: Budspawn (External)
1994: Box Set (PolyGram)
1994: Kill the Crow (PolyGram)
1995: Your Choice Live Series (Live album) (Your Choice Records)

Goatsnake
1998: IV (EP) (Prosthetic Records)
1998: Man of Light (EP) (Warpburner Recordings)
1999: Goatsnake Vol. 1 (Man's Ruin Records)
2000: Goatsnake/Burning Witch split (Hydra Head)
2000: Dog Days (EP) (Southern Lord Records)
2000: Flower of Disease (Man's Ruin Records)
2004: Trampled Under Hoof (EP) (Southern Lord Records)
2015: Black Age Blues (Southern Lord Records)

The Desert Sessions
1998: Volumes 1 & 2
1998: Volumes 3 & 4

Other
1997: Metro
2000: Queens of the Stone Age – Rated R (backing vocals on The Lost Art of Keeping a Secret) (Interscope Records)
2000: Sunn O))) – ØØ Void
2000: Earthlings? – The Earthlings?
2000: Earthlings? – Human Beans
2002: Earthlings? – Disco Marching Kraft (EP) (Crippled Dick Hot Wax)
2002: Orquesta del Desierto – Orquesta del Desierto
2004: Orquesta del Desierto – Dos
2008: Danko Jones – Never Too Loud (guest vocals on Forest for the Trees) (Aquarius Records, Bad Taste Records)
2008: Chingalera – Dose (guest vocals on Twenty Three)
2009: Earthlings? – Humalian (EP) (Treasurecraft Records)
2011: Sunn O))) meets Nurse with Wound – The Iron Soul of Nothing (vocals on Ash on the Trees)
2014: Teenage Time Killers – vocals on Plank Walk
2014: Foo Fighters – Sonic Highways (backing vocals on The Feast and the Famine)

References 

Scream (band) members
American punk rock singers
Living people
Goatsnake members
People from Fairfax County, Virginia
Earthlings? members
Year of birth missing (living people)
Wool (band) members